Muhammad Saqib Yousaf (born December 5, 1991 in Lahore) is a professional squash player who represented Pakistan. He reached a career-high world ranking of World No. 104 in December 2014.

References

External links
 
 

1991 births
Living people
Pakistani male squash players